György Zsolt Székely (born 2 June 1995) is a Hungarian former professional footballer who played as a goalkeeper.

Career
Székely made his professional debut for Paks in the Nemzeti Bajnokság I on 5 December 2015, starting in the home match against Ferencváros, which finished as a 5–0 loss.

References

External links
 
 
 
 
 Hungarian club statistics at HLSZ.hu
 National team statistics at MLSZ.hu

1995 births
Living people
Footballers from Budapest
Hungarian footballers
Association football goalkeepers
Hungary youth international footballers
Nemzeti Bajnokság I players
Nemzeti Bajnokság III players
Regionalliga players
TSV 1860 Munich II players
Paksi FC players
TSV Schott Mainz players
TSV 1860 Munich players
Hungarian expatriate footballers
Hungarian expatriate sportspeople in Germany
Expatriate footballers in Germany